The Departmental Council of Bas-Rhin (Alsatian: Départementrõt vum Underelsàss) was the deliberative assembly of the French department of Bas-Rhin. Its headquarters were in Place du Quartier Blanc in Strasbourg.

It was replaced, together with the departmental council of Haut-Rhin, by the Assembly of Alsace on January 1, 2021, following the creation of the European Collectivity of Alsace. Its last meeting was held on November 30, 2020. The members of the Bas-Rhin departmental council retained their mandate within the new Alsace assembly.

The last president of the departmental council was Frédéric Bierry.

Vice presidents

Composition 
The Council consists of 46 members (departmental councilors) elected from the 23 cantons of Bas-Rhin.

References 

Bas-Rhin
Bas-Rhin
Politics of Alsace